Sahib Shihab (born Edmund Gregory; June 23, 1925 – October 24, 1989) was an American jazz and hard bop saxophonist (baritone, alto, and soprano) and flautist. He variously worked with Luther Henderson, Thelonious Monk, Fletcher Henderson, Tadd Dameron, Dizzy Gillespie, Kenny Clarke, John Coltrane and Quincy Jones among others.

Biography
He was born in Savannah, Georgia, United States. Edmund Gregory first played alto saxophone professionally for Luther Henderson aged 13, and studied at the Boston Conservatory, and to perform with trumpeter Roy Eldridge. He played lead alto with Fletcher Henderson in the mid-1940s.

He was one of the first jazz musicians to convert to Islam and changed his name in 1947. He belonged to the Ahmadiyya sect of Islam. During the late 1940s, Shihab played with Thelonious Monk, and on July 23, 1951 he recorded with Monk (later issued on the album Genius of Modern Music: Volume 2). During this period, he also appeared on recordings by Art Blakey, Kenny Dorham and Benny Golson. The invitation to play with Dizzy Gillespie's big band in the early 1950s was of particular significance, as it marked Shihab's switch to baritone.

On August 12, 1958, Shihab was one of the musicians photographed by Art Kane in his photograph known as "A Great Day in Harlem". In 1959, he toured Europe with Quincy Jones. Shihab, disillusioned with racial politics in United States, decided around this time to move to Europe. He settled in Scandinavia, first in Stockholm, Sweden, then moving in 1964 to Copenhagen, Denmark. He worked for Copenhagen Polytechnic and wrote scores for television, cinema and theatre. He wrote a ballet based on the Danish writer Hans Christian Andersen's fairy tale, The Red Shoes.

In Denmark, Shihab performed with local musicians such as the bass player Niels-Henning Ørsted Pedersen amongst others. Together with pianist Kenny Drew, he ran a publishing firm and record company.

In 1961, he joined the Kenny Clarke/Francy Boland Big Band and remained a member of the band for the 12 years it existed. He married a Danish woman and raised a family in Europe.

In the Eurovision Song Contest 1966, Shihab accompanied Lill Lindfors and Svante Thuresson on stage for the Swedish entry "Nygammal Vals".

In 1973, Shihab returned to the United States for a three-year stay, working as a session musician for rock and pop artists and working as a copyist for local musicians. He spent his remaining years between New York and Copenhagen, and played in a partnership with Art Farmer. He also led his own jazz combo called Dues.

From 1986, Shihab was a visiting artist at Rutgers University.

Shihab died from liver cancer on October 24, 1989, in Nashville, Tennessee, United States, aged 64.

Discography

As leader
 1957: The Jazz We Heard Last Summer (Savoy) split album shared with Herbie Mann
 1957: Jazz Sahib (Savoy)
 1963: Sahib's Jazz Party (Debut) also released as Conversations
 1964: Summer Dawn (Argo)
 1965: Sahib Shihab and the Danish Radio Jazz Group (Oktav)
 1968: Seeds (Vogue Schallplatten)
 1964-70: Companionship (Vogue Schallplatten)
 1972: Sentiments (Storyville)
 1972: La Marche dans le Désert - Sahib Shihab + Gilson Unit (Futura)
 1973: Flute Summit (Atlantic) with Jeremy Steig, James Moody and Chris Hinze
 1988: Soul Mates (Uptown) with Charlie Rouse
 1998: And All Those Cats (compilation)

As sideman
With Art Blakey
Theory of Art (1957)
Art Blakey Big Band (Bethlehem, 1957)

With Brass Fever
Time Is Running Out (Impulse!, 1976)

With Donald Byrd
Jazz Lab (Columbia, 1957) with Gigi Gryce
Modern Jazz Perspective (Columbia, 1957) with Gigi Gryce

With Betty Carter
Out There (1958)
I Can't Help It (1992)

With the Kenny Clarke/Francy Boland Big Band
 Jazz Is Universal (Atlantic, 1962)
 Handle with Care (Atlantic, 1963)
 Now Hear Our Meanin' (Columbia, 1963 [1965])
 Swing, Waltz, Swing (Philips, 1966)
 Sax No End (SABA, 1967)
 Out of the Folk Bag (Columbia, 1967)
 17 Men and Their Music (Campi, 1967)
 All Smiles (MPS, 1968)
 Faces (MPS, 1969)
 Latin Kaleidoscope (MPS, 1968)
 Fellini 712 (MPS, 1969)
 All Blues (MPS, 1969)
 More Smiles (MPS, 1969)
 Clarke Boland Big Band en Concert avec Europe 1 (Tréma, 1969 [1992])
 Off Limits (Polydor, 1970)
 November Girl (Black Lion, 1970 [1975]) with Carmen McRae
 Change of Scenes (Verve, 1971) with Stan Getz

With John Coltrane
Coltrane (1957)
With Tadd Dameron
Fontainebleau (1956)
With Art Farmer
Manhattan (Soul Note, 1981)

With Curtis Fuller and Hampton Hawes
Curtis Fuller and Hampton Hawes with French Horns (Status, 1957 [1962]) - also released as Baritones and French Horns (Prestige, 1957)

With Dizzy Gillespie
Jazz Recital (Norgran, 1955)
The Dizzy Gillespie Reunion Big Band (MPS, 1968)
With Benny Golson
Benny Golson's New York Scene (Contemporary, 1957)
Take a Number from 1 to 10 (Argo, 1961)
With Johnny Griffin
Lady Heavy Bottom's Waltz (1968)
Griff 'N Bags
With George Gruntz
Noon in Tunisia (1967)
With Roy Haynes
Jazz Abroad (Emarcy, 1955)
With Milt Jackson
Plenty, Plenty Soul (Atlantic, 1957)
With Philly Joe Jones
Drums Around the World (Riverside, 1959)
With Quincy Jones
The Birth of a Band! (Mercury, 1959)
The Great Wide World of Quincy Jones (Mercury, 1959)
I Dig Dancers (Mercury, 1960)
Quincy Plays for Pussycats (Mercury, 1959-65 [1965])
With Abbey Lincoln
It's Magic (Riverside, 1958)With Howard McGheeThe Return of Howard McGhee (Bethlehem, 1955)With Thelonious MonkGenius of Modern Music: Volume 1 (Blue Note, 1947)
Genius of Modern Music: Volume 2 (Blue Note, 1951)With Phineas Newborn, Jr.Phineas Newborn, Jr. Plays Harold Arlen's Music from Jamaica (RCA Victor, 1957)With Oscar PettifordThe Oscar Pettiford Orchestra in Hi-Fi Volume Two (ABC-Paramount, 1957)With Specs PowellMovin' In (Roulette, 1957)With A. K. SalimBlues Suite (Savoy, 1958)With Tony Scott The Modern Art of Jazz (1957, Seeco) - with Bill Evans, Paul Motian
 Free Blown Jazz (1957, Carlton) - with Bill Evans, Paul MotianWith Mal WaldronMal-2 (1957)With Julius Watkins and Charlie RouseThe Jazz Modes (Atlantic, 1959)With Randy WestonUhuru Afrika (Roulette, 1960)With Gene Quill, Hal Stein and Phil Woods Four Altos (Prestige, 1957)]With Phil WoodsRights of Swing (Candid, 1961)With Idrees Sulieman'The Camel'' (Columbia, 1964)

References

1925 births
1989 deaths
American jazz flautists
American jazz saxophonists
American male saxophonists
Bebop flautists
Bebop saxophonists
Musicians from Georgia (U.S. state)
Hard bop flautists
Savoy Records artists
Hard bop saxophonists
Atlantic Records artists
African-American Muslims
Converts to Islam
20th-century American saxophonists
20th-century American male musicians
American male jazz musicians
Kenny Clarke/Francy Boland Big Band members
20th-century African-American musicians
20th-century flautists
Argo Records artists
Storyville Records artists
Uptown Records (jazz) artists